The Tyrrell 019 was a 1990 Formula One racing car, designed by a team led by Harvey Postlethwaite, and built by Tyrrell. It was an evolution of Postlethwaite's first design for Tyrrell, the Tyrrell 018.

The 019 marked a significant point in the evolution of Formula One design in having an elevated nose cone. This was the first time that such an idea had been tried in Formula One racing, and set the template for aerodynamic design ever since. The car was introduced two races into the 1990 Formula One season, scoring a point on its debut in the hands of Jean Alesi. This type of nose cone was gradually adopted by other teams and became the de rigueur design by 1996 in Formula One. The car was powered by the Ford DFR V8 engine - a descendant of the Cosworth DFV.

Design

Although the 018 had a modestly successful season in 1989, Harvey Postlethwaite did not rest on his laurels. Postlethwaite was an experienced F1 engineer, having previously built race-winning cars for Hesketh, Wolf and Ferrari, and so was well placed to spot the shortcomings of his own design. Taking the 018 as their base, Postlethwaite and Tyrrell Chief Designer Jean-Claude Migeot decided to try to improve the aerodynamic efficiency of the chassis. One area in particular attracted their attention: the underbody airflow. While true ground effect designs had been outlawed during the 1980s, the contemporary practice of coupling a flat, chassis undertray with a large rear diffuser meant that many cars still produced a significant proportion of their downforce through the generation of a low-pressure air mass underneath the car. What Postlethwaite and Migeot realised was that the efficiency of this low-pressure generating system was being seriously compromised by the low nose position at the front end of the car. These low nose cones effectively diverted air sideways and upwards around the cars' upper bodywork, and reduced the volume of air passing underneath the car. However, the generation of low pressures relies on increasing the speed of the air passing underneath the flat bottom of the car, in relation to that passing over and around it. In simple terms, the more air that can be drawn underneath a car, the faster that air will have to be moving, and the faster the air is moving, the lower the pressure. By raising the nose cone of the car, Postlethwaite and his team increased the volume of air that was able to pass underneath the car. Conversely, the efficiency of the front wing aerofoils are increased the closer they are to the ground. These conflicting requirements led to the design of the 019's distinctive inverted-V, anhedral front profile.

The engines were tuned for Tyrrell by Hart Racing Engines.

Competition history
In practice the car did not make the same impact in terms of results as it has in technological advancement. Although Alesi qualified a strong seventh and took a point for a sixth-place finish at its first race in San Marino, and then both qualified and finished in second place in Monaco, the remainder of the season resulted in only two points finishes. Nevertheless, as other teams experimented with the principle it rapidly became the norm for Formula One cars to sport a high nose cone. The last truly successful low nose design was the Williams FW16, built only four years after the Tyrrell's unveiling. After this car, all Formula One Championship winning chassis have followed Tyrrell's lead.

The Tyrrell 019 was replaced at the end of the 1990 season by the Tyrrell 020, a further evolution of Postlethwaite's high nose principle.

Complete Formula One World Championship results
(key)

 Seven points scored with the Tyrrell 018.

Notes

References
 Frankel, A. & Brundle, M. 2000. 50 Years of Formula One. Motor Sport. LXXVI/7 (July 2000), 24-37

Tyrrell Formula One cars